This is the complete list of Commonwealth Games medallists in lawn bowls from 1930 to 2018.

Men's

Men's singles

Men's pairs

Men's triples

Men's fours

Women's

Women's singles

Women's pairs

Women's triples

Women's fours

Para-sport

Men's visually impaired singles

Women's visually impaired singles

Mixed pairs

Open triples

See also
World Bowls Events
Lawn bowls at the Commonwealth Games

References
Results Database from the Commonwealth Games Federation

Lawn
Medalists

Commonw